Disney's Animal Kingdom is a theme park located at the Walt Disney World Resort. Below is a list of the past and present attractions at this park, arranged by "land" and with brief descriptions.

Restaurants, shops, and character meets are listed in this article. The term "attractions" is used by Disney as a catch-all term for rides, shows, and exhibits.

Discovery Island

Current attractions
 It's Tough to Be a Bug! - a 3D show based on the 1998 Disney/Pixar film A Bug's Life.
 Discovery Island Trails - an animal exhibit/walkthrough attraction.
 The Tree of Life - an artificial tree which is a park's icon featuring the sculptures of animals.

Past attractions

 Discovery River Boats - a riverboat ride. Originally opened on April 22, 1998. Closed in September 1998 and re-opened as Discovery River Taxis in November 1998. The attraction closed again in January 1999, only to be re-opened yet again in March 1999, this time as the Disney Radio River Cruise.

Past entertainment

  Mickey’s Jammin' Jungle Parade - a parade that centers around Mickey Mouse and other Disney animals paraded through Discovery Island to Africa.
 March of the Art-imals Parade - a parade showcasing the performance and floats of artistic style animals.

Pandora – The World of Avatar 

 Avatar Flight of Passage -  a flying augmented reality E-ticket simulator attraction, where guests fly on a mountain Banshee.
 Na'vi River Journey -  a boat dark ride attraction, showcasing the native fauna and flora of Pandora, including Audio-Animatronics and 3-D holograms.

Africa

Current attractions
Kilimanjaro Safaris - a safari-alike attraction that takes guests on the safari tour of African animals roams freely in the replica of African wildlife landscape.
Gorilla Falls Exploration Trail - an animal exhibit/walkthrough attraction featuring gorillas, colobus monkeys, okapis, etc.
Wild Africa Trek -  an animal exhibit/walkthrough attraction with African animals located nearby Kilimanjaro Safaris.
Wildlife Express Train, Harambe Station - a train ride.
Festival of the Lion King  - a live musical revue performance based on the 1994 classic animated film The Lion King.

Past attractions 
A Celebration of Festival of the Lion King

Rafiki's Planet Watch

Current attractions
Affection Section
The Animation Experience at Conservation Station  
Habitat Habit! 
Wildlife Express Train

Asia

Current attractions
 Expedition Everest - a roller coaster themed to Mount Everest.
 Kali River Rapids - a river rapids ride along the Chakranadi River.
 Maharajah Jungle Trek - a tour featuring more than 100 species of animals.
 Feathered Friends in Flight - a stage show featuring exotic birds.

Past attractions
 Flights of Wonder - closed on December 31, 2017 New Year's Eve. Replaced by UP! A Great Bird Adventure.
 UP! A Great Bird Adventure - Opened April 22, 2018, replacing Flights of Wonder. It was a stage show featuring exotic birds and characters from Disney/Pixar's Up. The final performance was on March 12, 2020, due to the COVID-19 outbreak impacting Florida. Replaced by Feathered Friends in Flight.
 Rivers of Light - Performances suspended during COVID-19 pandemic. Permanent closure announced on July 16, 2020.

DinoLand U.S.A.

Current attractions
 Dinosaur - A time traveling dark ride where guest travel to the time of the dinosaurs to save an Iguanodon only to be pursued by a Carnotarus.
 Dino-Sue - A bronze cast of Sue the Tyrannosaurus, located outside Dinosaur, which Disney and McDonald's helped acquire for the Field Museum. Some of the fossil preparation work for Sue was done at the park in a temporary Fossil Preparation Lab.
 Cretaceous Trail - A small garden featuring plant life that existed in the Mesozoic with statues of dinosaurs. Currently doubles as a meet and greet space for Donald Duck.
 The Boneyard - a dinosaur-themed playground aimed at kids under 5
 Kids Discovery Clubs
 Chester and Hester's Dino-Rama
 TriceraTop Spin - An aerial carousel-style ride similar to Dumbo the Flying Elephant and The Magic Carpets of Aladdin but with Triceratops.
 Finding Nemo: The Big Blue… and Beyond! - A live puppet and musical stage show telling the story of the movie.

Past attractions
 Tarzan Rocks - A stage musical based on the 1999 film Tarzan
 Journey into Jungle Book
 Dinosaur Jubilee - A dinosaur skeleton exhibit held in a large tent structure, replaced by Dino-Rama
Finding Nemo - The Musical
 Primeval Whirl
Disney KiteTails

See also
List of Disney theme park attractions
List of lands at Disney theme parks
List of Magic Kingdom attractions
List of Epcot attractions
List of Disney's Hollywood Studios attractions

References

Bibliography

Lists of Disney attractions